Creative Court is an organisation that develops art projects and reflects on peace and justice. Creative Court is based in The Hague, the Netherlands. It was founded in November 2013.

And Now I Am Here

Project description 

In 2015 two journalists, Els Duran and Evelien Vehof, conducted interviews regarding statelessness in Europe in which they came across complicated regulations, coping mechanisms and pragmatism. Creative Court developed the video installation And Now I Am Here based upon these findings. This video installation questions feelings of displacement from various angles through the use of interview, excerpts and quotes from literature and philosophy which are merged with the images of video artist Farah Rahman, whose work revolves around migration.

This video installation was created as part of the framework of the Europe by People arts and design programme which took place during the Dutch presidency of the Council of the European Union in 2016.

Artists and experts involved 
Video artist: Farah Rahman
Research and interviews: Giselle Vegter, Els Duran, Evelien Vehof
Interpretation and translations: Carlijn Teeven, Myrte Sara Huyts, Morgan Mekertichian
Production: Anja Janssen
Artistic and business management: Creative Court

Exhibitions 
, Nijmegen
Muziekgebouw aan 't IJ, Amsterdam
Compagnietheater, Amsterdam
The Wall, Amsterdam

Recognition 
Articles
Compagnietheatre (Dutch)
Europe by People (English)
Montesquieu Instituut (English)
Nederlands Kamerkoor (Dutch)
Nederlands Kamerkoor (English)
Radio
Kunst en Cultuur op Vrijdag on AmsterdamFM (Dutch)

Post-Conflict Mind Check

Project description 

Post-Conflict Mind Check (working title The Ghost of Tito) is a tongue-in-cheek prototype card game created by Creative Court and MediaLAB about culture, history, conflict, and stereotypes in the six countries that once made up the former Yugoslavia. The game aims to engage players with socially taboo topics and unconventional content. It was developed in 2015 to be used for personal reflection and critical thinking about post-war legacy in the former Yugoslavia.

Artists and experts involved 
Commissioner: Creative Court
Project mentor: Tamara Pinos
Students: Jon Jonoski (MA media studies), Jennifer Lamphere (MA history) and Liliana Zambrano (BA industrial design)

Presentations 
MediaLAB, Amsterdam

Recognition
Blog
Post-Conflict Mind Check, MediaLAB (English)

Rooms of Humanity

Project description 
With De Balie, a centre for freedom of speech, art, politics, culture, cinema and media in Amsterdam, Creative Court produced Rooms of Humanity, a reflective programme, around (in)humanity in times of war and genocide. It debuted in The Netherlands at De Balie in Amsterdam on Saturday, 19 September 2015.

The theatre installation consists of the Room of Game, the Room of Propaganda, the Room of Acts for Humanity, and the Room of Questions and Answers and includes photographic and textual visuals, an audio installation, as well as group activities and discussions. Rooms of Humanity connects to themes such as individual and collective responsibility, exclusion, war, genocide, (in)humanity, propaganda, and the dynamic between victim – perpetrator – bystander.

Artists and experts involved 
Artistic directors: Ilil Land-Boss (Israel-Germany) and Giselle Vegter (the Netherlands)
Scenic design: Karin Betzler
Business management: Creative Court
Special guest speakers: 
Nenad Fišer, a philosopher and former employee of the International Criminal Tribunal for the former Yugoslavia in The Hague
Erna Rijsdijk, a university lecturer in military ethics at the Netherlands Defence Academy (NLDA)
Inger Schaap, a historian and the national director of Humanity in Action in the Netherlands
Uğur Ümit Üngör, a sociologist, political historian, and genocide researcher at the NIOD Institute for War, Holocaust, and Genocide Studies
Moderator: Markha Valenta, a professor of American studies at Radboud University Nijmegen

Exhibitions 
Theatre installation, De Balie, Amsterdam

Recognition 
Articles
What is Happening Now? (English)

Radio
Dichtbij Nederland (Dutch)

Africans and Hague Justice

Project description 

Creative Court curated a selection of African cartoons that reflect on the International Criminal Court. The selection was made in the framework of the Nederlandse Vereniging voor Afrika Studies conference, Africans and Hague Justice, Realities and Perceptions of the International Criminal Court in Africa, which took place at The Hague University of Applied Sciences in May 2014.

Artists involved 

The following cartoonists are represented in the collection:  Alphonce 'Ozone' Omondi (Kenya), Brandan Reynolds (South Africa), Cuan Miles (South Africa), Damien Glez (Burkina Faso/France), Mohammed 'Dr. Meddy' Jumanne (Tanzania), Godfrey 'Gado' Mwampembwa (Tanzania), Jonathon 'Zapiro' Shapiro (South Africa), Khalid Albaih (Sudan/Qatar), Khalil Bendib (Algeria/US), Popa 'Kamtu' Matumula (Tanzania), Roland Polman (Ivory Coast), Talal Nayer (Sudan/Tunisia), Tayo Fatunla (UK/Nigeria), and Victor Ndula (Kenya).

Exhibitions 

Post-Conflict group exhibition, Nichido Contemporary Art, Tokyo
Post-Conflict group exhibition, Kinz + Tillou Fine Art Gallery, New York
Africans and Hague Justice, African Studies Centre, University of Leiden
Africans and Hague Justice, The Hague University of Applied Science

Recognition 
Articles
Leiden University
Daily Nation
ILG2
Creating Rights
Coalition for the International Criminal Court#globalJUSTICE

Television
The Docket on MSNBC

Rwanda 20 Years: Portraits of Reconciliation

Project description 

Creative Court developed a photography project that reflects on forgiveness in post-genocide Rwanda. They commissioned South African photographer Pieter Hugo and Croatian-Dutch photographer Lana Mesić to try and capture the nature of forgiveness. The project includes photographs, interviews, and videos.

Exhibitions 
Anatomy of Forgiveness, AMC Brummelkamp Galerie, Amsterdam
Art Rotterdam Prospects and Concepts Exhibition, Art Rotterdam, Rotterdam
Harry Pennings Award group exhibition, Galerie Pennings, Eindhoven
Exhibition, Organ Vida International Photography Festival 7th ed, Zagreb
Exhibition, Goethe Institut Kigali, Kigali
Post-Conflict group exhibition, Nichido Contemporary Art, Tokyo
Post-Conflict group exhibition, Kinz + Tillou Fine Art Gallery, New York
Exhibition, Het Nutshuis, The Hague
Outdoor mini exhibition, Central Station, The Hague
Outdoor mini exhibition, International Criminal Court, The Hague
Outdoor mini exhibition, Peace Palace, The Hague
Mini exhibition, The Hague City Hall, The Hague

Recognition 
Articles
The Calvert Journal (English)
Feature Shoot (English)
The New York Times (English)
Embassy of the Republic of Rwanda Netherlands (English + Dutch)
Time Lightbox (English)
United States Institute of Peace Global Peacebuilding Center (English)
The Huffington Post (English)
Future TV Network (Arabic)
New Statesman (English)
Reading The Pictures (formerly BagNews) (English)
Everyday Ambassador (English)
The Hairpin (English)	
Episcopal Café (English)
Glamour Paris (French)
AfriqueConnection.com (French)		
EO Beam (Dutch)
IGIHE (Kinyarwanda)
Religion Factor (English)
Kontrapress (Serbian)
Blogg HD(Swedish)
Who Cares (Dutch)	
Liberal Planet (English)
Common Dreams (English)
Tabnak (Persian)
Mad House News (Russian)
Domingo El Universal (Spanish)
Los Herrajeros (Spanish)
La Nacion (Spanish)
Moscabranca (Portuguese)
Inspirulina (Spanish)
Le Vif (French)
Chatelaine (English)
RonnieArias.com (Spanish)
Nafir (Persian)
Noor News (Persian)
Sadkhabar (Persian)
Parsine (Persian)
De Volkskrant (Dutch)
Filosofie (Dutch)
Jewish Journal (English)
Revolución 3.0, Argos media (Spanish)
Organization for Security and Co-Operation in Europe (English) 
IBA Global Healing (English)
Sentidos Comunes (Spanish)
Incubadora de Artistas (Portuguese)
Para Ti Magazine (Spanish)
Fondazione Camis de Fonseca (Italian)
Memory Machine (Dutch)
Westminster Chapel (English)
Art Annual Online (Japanese)
Ousferrats (Spanish)
Inya Rwanda (Kinyarwanda)
Fuett.mx (Spanish)
40 Cheragh (Persian)
Beelddragers (Dutch)
Diaspora Enligne (French)
Partido Socialista (Spanish)
Acción Preferente (Spanish)
Reader's Digest (English)
The Courier Mail (English)
RYOT News & Action (English)
Marie Claire South Africa (English)
Den Haag Direct (Dutch)
Musée Digital Magazine (English)
Dar lugar (Spanish)
MiNDFOOD (English)
Greenpeace Magazin (German)
The East African (English)
Coalition for the International Criminal Court#globalJUSTICE (English)
Citizens for Global Solutions (English)
A Journey into Holocaust & Genocide Education (English)
Invisible Children (English)
Creating Rights (English)
Human Trustees (English)
NRC (Dutch)
New Dawn (Dutch)
A Pattern A Day (English)
Index.hr (Croatian)

Radio and television
Q on CBC Radio One in Canada (English)
Schepper & Co Radio (English)
The Docket on MSNBC (English)
Ebony Life Television (English)
Globo.tv (Portuguese)
Prime 10 TV (Kinyarwanda + English)

Partners and funding 
Association Modeste et Innocent (Rwanda), City of The Hague, Doctors Without Borders, Foundation for Democracy and Media, Goethe-Institut Kigali (Rwanda), Haagse Hogeschool (The Hague School of Applied Sciences), Hogeschool INHolland, Huis van Gedichten, Humanity House, International Institute of Social Studies, Justitia et Pax, Karekezi Film Productions (Rwanda), Leiden University, Liberation Festival the Hague / Bevrijdingsfestival Den Haag, Mediaridders, Mondrian Fund, Mukomeze Foundation, Nederlandse Vereniging voor Afrika Studies (NVAS),  NIOD Institute for War, Holocaust and Genocide Studies / Nationaal Instituut voor Oorlogs-, Holocaust- en Genocidestudies (NIOD), Nutshuis Den Haag, Prince Claus Fund, Tilburg University, United Nations High Commissioner for Refugees (UNHCR), amongst others.

References 

Organisations based in The Hague
Arts organisations based in the Netherlands
Dutch photography organisations
Human rights organisations based in the Netherlands
International Criminal Court
Reconciliation
Society of Rwanda